A human zoo is a public exhibition of humans.

Human Zoo may also refer to:

Music
 Human Zoo (Gotthard album), 2003, or the title track
 Human Zoo (Electric Six album), 2014
 "Human Zoo", a 2018 song by Boy George and Culture Club from the 2018 album Life

Other uses
 The Human Zoo (book), a 1969 book by Desmond Morris
 The Human Zoo (radio), a UK radio programme presented by Tommy Boyd
 Human Zoo (film), a 2009 film by Rie Rasmussen
 The Human Zoo, a reality television series with psychologist Philip Zimbardo